Tucano, also Tukano or Tucana, endonym Dahseyé (Dasea), is a Tucanoan language spoken in Amazonas, Brazil and Colombia.

Many Tariana people, speakers of the endangered Tariana language are switching to Tucano.

Phonology

Consonants 

Nasal sounds [m n ŋ] are variants of voiced stops /b d ɡ/ between nasal vowels. Stops may also be heard as prenasalized [ᵐb ⁿd ᵑɡ] after nasal vowels. /w/ can be heard as nasal bilabial semivowel  when in the environment of nasal vowels.

Vowels

See also 
 Tucano people

References

Spanish
 Tukanos

Bibliography
A Fala Tukano dos Ye'pâ-Masa: Tomo I: Gramática . Henri Ramirez (1997) · Manaus: Inspetoria Salesiana Missionária da Amazônia, CEDEM.
Welch, Betty and West, Birdie (2000). In Lenguas indígenas de Colombia: una visión descriptiva edited by González de Pérez, María Stella and Rodríguez de Montes, María Luisa. Instituto Caro y Cuervo.
Bibliografía de la familia lingüística Tukano (antes Betoya) ( pp. 79-104 ). Marcelino de Castellvi (1939). In Proceedings of the second convention of the Inter American Bibliographical and Library Association 2:2 Washington, D.C.
 Campbell, Lyle. (1997). American Indian languages: The historical linguistics of Native America. New York: Oxford University Press. .
Proto Tucanoan ( pp. 119-149 ). Nathan E. Waltz and Alva Wheeler (1972). In Comparative Studies in Amerindian Languages Mouton de Gruyter.

External links 

 Tucanoan Languages Collection of Janet Chernela, housed at AILLA, containing audio recordings, transcriptions, translations and field notes from the 1970s and 1980s. 

Tucanoan languages
Languages of Brazil
Languages of Colombia